The 2015 Madrilenian regional election was held on Sunday, 24 May 2015, to elect the 10th Assembly of the Community of Madrid. All 129 seats in the Assembly were up for election. The election was held simultaneously with regional elections in twelve other autonomous communities and local elections all throughout Spain.

The ruling People's Party (PP) emerged once again as the largest political force in the region, but it saw a substantial drop in its vote support and the loss of the absolute majority it had held almost uninterruptedly since 1995—with a brief interlude in 2003—. However, as both the Spanish Socialist Workers' Party (PSOE) and newcomer Podemos fell one seat short of an absolute majority, it meant that the PP could remain in government through an agreement with liberal Citizens (C's). As a result, Cristina Cifuentes became the new President of the Community of Madrid, forming a minority government with C's providing confidence and supply. Cifuentes would be the third regional President in three years, after Esperanza Aguirre's resignation in 2012 and incumbent president Ignacio González not running for the office as a result of several scandals.

The strong performance of both Podemos and C's was at the expense of left-wing United Left (IU)—which lost its parliamentary representation for the first time in history as a result of not reaching the required 5% threshold—and Union, Progress and Democracy (UPyD), whose parliamentary presence was ephemeral having only entered the regional parliament in 2011.

Overview

Electoral system
The Assembly of Madrid was the devolved, unicameral legislature of the autonomous community of Madrid, having legislative power in regional matters as defined by the Spanish Constitution and the Madrilenian Statute of Autonomy, as well as the ability to vote confidence in or withdraw it from a regional president.

Voting for the Assembly was on the basis of universal suffrage, which comprised all nationals over 18 years of age, registered in the Community of Madrid and in full enjoyment of their political rights. Additionally, Madrilenians abroad were required to apply for voting before being permitted to vote, a system known as "begged" or expat vote. All members of the Assembly of Madrid were elected using the D'Hondt method and a closed list proportional representation, with an electoral threshold of five percent of valid votes—which included blank ballots—being applied regionally. The Assembly was entitled to one member per each 50,000 inhabitants or fraction greater than 25,000.

Election date
The term of the Assembly of Madrid expired four years after the date of its previous election, with elections to the Assembly being fixed for the fourth Sunday of May every four years. The previous election was held on 22 May 2011, setting the election date for the Assembly on Sunday, 24 May 2015.

The president had the prerogative to dissolve the Assembly of Madrid and call a snap election, provided that no motion of no confidence was in process, no nationwide election was due and some time requirements were met: namely, that dissolution did not occur either during the first legislative session or within the legislature's last year ahead of its scheduled expiry, nor before one year had elapsed since a previous dissolution. In the event of an investiture process failing to elect a regional president within a two-month period from the first ballot, the Assembly was to be automatically dissolved and a fresh election called. Any snap election held as a result of these circumstances would not alter the period to the next ordinary election, with elected deputies merely serving out what remained of their four-year terms.

Background
After the 2011 regional election, the People's Party (PP) was re-elected to a fourth consecutive term in office with an absolute majority of seats, with the Spanish Socialist Workers' Party (PSOE) under Tomás Gómez obtaining the worst result of its history in the region up until that point. On 17 September 2012, President Esperanza Aguirre, who had renewed the office for a third term, resigned allegedly a result of health issues but also for "personal reasons", being succeeded in the presidency by her deputy, Ignacio González.

Opinion polls from 2012 predicted a drop in vote support for the PP, to the point that it could lose the absolute majority it had enjoyed almost uninterruptedly since 1995. The same polls had shown that the PSOE remained unable to capitalize on the PP government's electoral wear. On the 2014 European Parliament election, both parties obtained historic lows in the region: with 29.9%, the PP result was its lowest since 1989, while the PSOE's result at 18.9% was the party's lowest score ever. A newly created party, Podemos, was able to poll at 11.3%, placing itself as the third political force of the community and within striking distance of the PSOE. Podemos's growth in opinion polls since mid-to-late 2014 at the expense of the PSOE's vote inspired fears within the party that it could be displaced to third place both regionally and nationally.

Parliamentary composition
The Assembly of Madrid was officially dissolved on 31 March 2015, after the publication of the dissolution decree in the Official Gazette of the Community of Madrid. The table below shows the composition of the parliamentary groups in the Assembly at the time of dissolution.

Parties and candidates
The electoral law allowed for parties and federations registered in the interior ministry, coalitions and groupings of electors to present lists of candidates. Parties and federations intending to form a coalition ahead of an election were required to inform the relevant Electoral Commission within ten days of the election call, whereas groupings of electors needed to secure the signature of at least 0.5 percent of the electorate in the Community of Madrid, disallowing electors from signing for more than one list of candidates.

Below is a list of the main parties and electoral alliances which contested the election:

On 11 February 2015, PSOE secretary-general Pedro Sánchez removed Tomás Gómez, PSOE candidate for the 2015 regional election, from the party's regional leadership. The decision came, allegedly, after suspicions of Gómez being involved in a tram project corruption scandal during his time as Mayor of Parla, though electoral motives may have helped hasten the move, as Gómez was deemed a bad candidate as Rafael Simancas later recognized. Ángel Gabilondo, former Education minister in José Luis Rodríguez Zapatero's cabinet from 2009 to 2011, was selected as PSOE's leading candidate in the region replacing Gómez on 21 February 2015.

In United Left (IU), Tania Sánchez, elected as party's presidential candidate in a primary election held on 1 December 2014, had left the party on 4 February 2015 alongside a number of supporters, over an internal conflict with the party's regional leadership, involved in the Caja Madrid "black" credit cards scandal. Luis García Montero, a Spanish poet and literary critic, was selected to replace Sánchez' as IU candidate to the Community of Madrid.

The PP had not yet proclaimed a candidate as of February 2015, despite incumbent President Ignacio González being widely presumed to stand for a second term in office. On 2 March 2015, Spanish newspaper El Mundo's headlines pointed out that González' had asked National Police officers to withhold information over an ongoing investigation on him about a possible tax fraud in the purchase of a luxury penthouse. González announced that he was the victim of policial 'blackmail' and reiterated his wish to be his party's candidate for the 2015 election. However, rumours arose in the media that the party's leadership had withdrawn their support from González and expected him to eventually give up on his intention to run. Finally, on 6 March 2015, incumbent Government delegate in Madrid Cristina Cifuentes was chosen as PP candidate for the autonomous community, while former regional president Esperanza Aguirre was nominated as candidate to the City Council of Madrid.

Opinion polls
The tables below list opinion polling results in reverse chronological order, showing the most recent first and using the dates when the survey fieldwork was done, as opposed to the date of publication. Where the fieldwork dates are unknown, the date of publication is given instead. The highest percentage figure in each polling survey is displayed with its background shaded in the leading party's colour. If a tie ensues, this is applied to the figures with the highest percentages. The "Lead" column on the right shows the percentage-point difference between the parties with the highest percentages in a poll.

Graphical summary

Voting intention estimates
The table below lists weighted voting intention estimates. Refusals are generally excluded from the party vote percentages, while question wording and the treatment of "don't know" responses and those not intending to vote may vary between polling organisations. When available, seat projections determined by the polling organisations are displayed below (or in place of) the percentages in a smaller font; 65 seats were required for an absolute majority in the Assembly of Madrid.

Voting preferences
The table below lists raw, unweighted voting preferences.

Victory preferences
The table below lists opinion polling on the victory preferences for each party in the event of a regional election taking place.

Victory likelihood
The table below lists opinion polling on the perceived likelihood of victory for each party in the event of a regional election taking place.

Preferred President
The table below lists opinion polling on leader preferences to become president of the Community of Madrid.

Results

Overall

Elected legislators
The following table lists the elected legislators sorted by order of election.

Aftermath

Government formation

Investiture processes to elect the President of the Community of Madrid required for an absolute majority—more than half the votes cast—to be obtained in the first ballot. If unsuccessful, a new ballot would be held 48 hours later requiring of a simple majority—more affirmative than negative votes—to succeed. If none of such majorities were achieved, successive candidate proposals could be processed under the same procedure. In the event of the investiture process failing to elect a regional president within a two-month period from the first ballot, the Assembly would be automatically dissolved and a snap election called.

2017 motion of no confidence

2018 investiture
The PSOE announced that it would table a motion of no confidence on Cifuentes' government, after it was revealed that Cifuentes could have obtained a master's degree through fraudulent means and that documents were falsified in order to cover up the scandal. After Cifuentes' resignation as a result of the ensuing scandals, the motion of censure was cancelled and Ángel Garrido was elected as new president.

Notes

References
Opinion poll sources

Other

2015 in the Community of Madrid
Madrid
Regional elections in the Community of Madrid
May 2015 events in Spain